The Samtgemeinde Rodenberg is a collective municipality in Lower Saxony, Germany, of about 16,000 inhabitants. It is situated in the east of the district of Schaumburg at the slopes of the hills Deister and Süntel. Its seat is in the town of Rodenberg.

Subdivisions
The collective municipality consists of:
 Apelern (with the quarters Groß Hegesdorf, Kleinhegesdorf, Lyhren, Reinsdorf and Soldorf)
 Hülsede (with the quarters Meinsen and Schmarrie)
 Lauenau (with the quarter Feggendorf)
 Messenkamp (with the quarter Altenhagen II)
 Pohle
 Rodenberg (with the quarter Algesdorf)

Politics
The local elections as of 2014 arose the following result:

Council
 SPD: 24 seats
 CDU: 17 seats
 FDP: 1 seat
 WGA:                                1 seat
 The Left :   1 seat
 Alliance '90/The Greens    :     6 seats
 WGS:                                4 seats
 WIR: 1 seat

Chairman is Heinrich Oppenhausen (SPD).

Mayor
Mayor of the collective municipality (German: Samtgemeindebürgermeister) is Thomas Wolf (independent), elected in 2021.

References 

Samtgemeinden in Lower Saxony